Staphylinus is a genus of beetles in the family Staphylinidae.

Selected species from Europe

S. agarici
S. alatus
S. anceps
S. angustatus
S. arnicae
S. biclavatus
S. bicolor
S. brevipes
S. caesareus
S. cantharellus
S. carinthiacus
S. cephalotes
S. clavatus
S. compressus
S. corporaali
S. crassipes
S. cursor
S. cyanipennis
S. cylindricus
S. daimio
S. dichrous
S. domicellus
S. erythropterus
S. erythropus
S. flavicornis
S. flavipennis
S. flavus
S. floreus
S. fodinarum
S. formicarius
S. fuscus
S. glaber
S. glaucus
S. griseipennis
S. haemorrhoidalis
S. hellebori
S. ignavus
S. latus
S. limbatus
S. lituratus
S. lugubris
S. macropterus
S. marginalis
S. marginatus
S. marginellus
S. medioximus
S. melanocephalus
S. melanophthalmus
S. melanurus
S. minor
S. minutus
S. obscurus
S. oculatus
S. picatus
S. picipennis
S. propinquus
S. punctatus
S. puncticollis
S. pusillus
S. pygmaeus
S. quentzeli
S. rhyssostomus
S. rubellus
S. rubricollis
S. rubricornis
S. rufescens
S. ruficornis
S. rufipes
S. saxatilis
S. springeri
S. subterraneus
S. turfosus
S. velox

References

Staphylininae